, also known as Embetsu, is a town located in Rumoi, Hokkaidō, Japan. As of 2013, the town had an estimated population of 2,966 and a density of 5 persons per km². The town is bisected by the Enbetsu River, which flows from the Teshio Mountains directly into the Sea of Japan. Enbetsu is the northernmost area of rice production in Japan.

Etymology

The name of the town of Enbetsu has its origin in the Ainu language. Three possibilities exist: Wen-pet, meaning "bad river"; "We-bet", meaning "forked river"; or "E-ye-pet", meaning "meeting place river", as Enbetsu was a meeting place of the seaside Ainu and the Ainu of the Teshio Mountains.

Geography

Enbetsu is located at the north-northwest of the island of Hokkaido and overlooks the Japan Sea. The town occupies the drainage basin of the Enbetsu River from its origin on the western slopes of the Teshio Mountains to its mouth at the Sea of Japan. The west of the town is forested and sparsely inhabited. The small commercial and residential center of the town is located at the mouth of the river on the Japan Sea. Enbetsu is home to an onsen hot spring resort, the Asahi Spa in Kotoura. A small mud volcano is located in the marshes in the immediate vicinity of the hot spring.

Rivers

The Enbetsu River flows from its source in the Teshio Mountains on the border of Enbetsu and Horokanai, north-northwest through the town and into the Sea of Japan. The city center and town hall are all located at the mouth of the Enbetsu. Major tributaries of the Enbetsu include the Takinosawa, Kumanosawa, Nupuripaomanai, Nupurikeshiomappu, and Rubeshube rivers. Nearly  of the Enbetsu is used for rice paddy agriculture. The rice paddies of the Enbetsu make up the northernmost border of the wide belt of rice production in Japan; the town is therefore known as the northernmost area of rice production in the country. A stone monument to the history of rice production in Japan was constructed in Enbetsu in 1957.

Mountains

Mount Pisshiri, the highest point in Enbetsu, is located to the very south of the town on its border with the towns Haboro and Horokanai. Pisshiri is the highest peak in the Teshio Mountains, and is also the source of the Enbetsu River.

Neighboring municipalities

Enbetsu borders on five municipalities in Hokkaido Prefecture, three in Rumoi Subprefecture and two in Kamikawa Subprefecture:
Rumoi Subprefecture
Teshio
Haboro
Shosanbetsu
Kamikawa Subprefecture
Nakagawa
Horokanai

Climate
Teshio is noted for its harsh climate. It has numerous days of rain, few days of sunlight, and strong winds. Temperatures vary widely. Winds off the Sea of Japan coast support wind farms in the town.

History

The first recorded Japanese settler of Enbetsu was Gentarō Shirahata, who moved to Enbetsu in 1896. A group of settlers from Echizen, Fukui Prefecture called the Echizen Dantai came to Enbetsu in the following year. Groups from Aichi, Chiba, and Kumamoto followed, as well as individual settlers. Enbetsu, which had previously been part of Teshio, was established as a separate village in 1909. Rice production was tested as early as 1897, specifically with strains of rice from Fukui Prefecture. After testing numerous strains from other parts of Honshu, 1921 saw a successful rice crop in Enbetsu, and the start of an agricultural industry in the village.

Enbetsu was elevated to town status in 1949. The town grew to a population of 8,944 in 1958, and has entered into a  period of sustained depopulation. Both the agriculture and fishing industries of Enbetsu have fallen into decline, notably with the decline of the Pacific herring catch. Younger people from Enbetsu have migrated to work in larger cities in Hokkaido and Honshu, contributing to the depopulation of the town.

Economy

The primary agricultural product of Enbetsu is rice, specifically of glutinous rice for the preparation of mochi. Asparagus and melons are also grown in the town. The local economy also depends on dairy farming and fishing. Enbetsu is a source of flounder and Yesso scallops.

Schools

The Town of Enbetsu Board of Education maintains one elementary school, Enbetsu Elementary School, and one junior high school, Enbetsu Junior High School. The elementary school is located to the northeast of the Town Hall, in the central Honchō district, while the junior high school is located to the southeast, in the eastern Kōwa district. Enbetsu also maintains a single municipal preschool, which is located next to the elementary school.

Hokkaido Enbetsu Agricultural High School, a prefectural high school, is located in the Kitahama district of the town, a short distance from the town center. The high school was founded in 1952.

Transportation

Enbetsu was once connected to the rest of Hokkaido by the JR Hokkaido Haboro Line. The line, completed in 1958, connected Rumoi with Sapporo. Utakoshi, Teshiokanaura, Enbetsu, Keimeikarijōkōjō, and Marumatsu were all stations on the line located in Enbetsu. The Haboro Line was discontinued in March 1987. Currently, the closest JR Hokkaido train stations accessible from Enbetsu via public transport is located in Horonobe, to the north, and Rumoi, to the south.

Bus

The JR Haboro Line was replaced by the Engan Bus Company. Enbetsu Station is now used as a bus terminal.

Roads

Enbetsu can be reached by car from Sapporo in approximately four hours, from Asahikawa in three hours, and from Wakkanai or Rumoi in an hour and a half. Japan National Route 232 crosses the town from north to south along the Japan Sea coast.

Hospital
Enbetsu has a single hospital, the Enbetsu National Health Insurance Hospital. The hospital, a municipal facility, was constructed in 1951, and is located in the central Honchō district of the town. Enbetsu National Health Insurance Hospital is the only hospital between Wakkanai to the north and Rumoi to the south.

Mascot

Enbetsu's mascot is  who is a Ezo flying squirrel. It is discovered in Summer 1992 during an expedition on the woods. Research is still ongoing regarding this mascot but what scientists know is that it is playful and helpful and can also fly. It prefers to wear green and red scarves.

Internationality

Starting in 1989, Enbetsu has maintained a sister city relationship with Castlegar, BC. As part of the relationship, an educational exchange program occurs each summer between the town and city. Students visit their counterpart in alternating years, fostering an understanding of differing cultures and way of living.

References

External links

Official Website 

Towns in Hokkaido